Mária Melová-Henkel (born 21 October 1975) is a retired Slovak high jumper.

She finished fifth at the 1999 World Indoor Championships. She also competed at the 1997 World Indoor Championships and the 2002 European Championships without reaching the final.

Her personal best jump is 1.92 metres. She had 1.96 metres on the indoor track, achieved in February 1997 in Banská Bystrica.

References

1975 births
Living people
Slovak female high jumpers